Lucy M. Hall-Brown (Hall; November 1843August 1, 1907) was an American physician and writer. She was a general practitioner and keen on education.

In 1876, she entered the University of Michigan for a medical course. Upon graduation in 1878, she served for six months as assistant physician under Dr. Eliza Maria Mosher at the Massachusetts Reformatory Prison for Women. She then pursued post-graduate work in New York City and London, being the first woman admitted to clinics in St Thomas' Hospital, London. Later, she became intern at the Royal Lying-in and Gynecological Hospital of Prof. Franz von Winckel in Dresden. Upon her arrival in Dresden, she knew scarcely any German, but after a month's study, she had acquired sufficient knowledge to warrant Dr. Winckel in admitting her to his hospital. On the completion of study and service abroad, in 1879, and while still in Dresden, she was appointed by Gov. Thomas Talbot, on Mosher's recommendation, resident-physician to the Massachusetts Reformatory and returned at once to take up the work. Later, she received but declined the appointment as superintendent.

In 1883, Mosher, being appointed professor of physiology, hygiene and resident physician to Vassar College, asked to have Hall appointed to share the work, the two at this time starting a partnership, beginning their private work in Brooklyn and serving alternately at college. At the end of three years, Hall gave her entire time to practice in Brooklyn and continued so working until three years before her death.

She was a member of the National Red Cross Society and also a delegate to the International Red Cross Congress at Karlsruhe in 1887, and Vienna in 1897. She was also Fellow of the New York Academy of Medicine, and vice-president of the American Social Science Association. She was a delegate to the International Congress of Medicine at Paris in 1900, and was frequently appointed by the New York Boards as an expert in medical jurisprudence.

Early life and education
Lucy Mabel Hall was born in Holland, Vermont, November 1843. She was a descendant of Gov. Thomas Dudley of Massachusetts. Of New England ancestry, her family can be traced back to a titled ancestry in the Old World.

Her education was begun in her native State, continued in Milton College, Wisconsin, and in the Dearborn Seminary, Chicago, Illinois, from which she was graduated. She graduated with distinction from the Medical Department of the University of Michigan, in 1878; and studied medicine in London and Leipzig.

She passed her early life in the Northwest.

Career

Physician
She taught successfully for a few years, but soon after the death of her mother and father, she was persuaded by the family physician to begin the study of medicine. In the spring of 1878, Hall was graduated with distinction from the medical department of the University of Michigan, Ann Arbor, Michigan. She continued her medical observations in the hospitals and clinics of New York City, and later in those of London, where in St Thomas' Hospital, she was the first woman ever received at its bedside clinics. In Dresden, Germany, she was house physician in the Royal Lying-in and Gynaecological Hospital, under Prof. Winckel.

From there, she was called back to the United States, where she was appointed by Gov. Talbot, of Massachusetts, to the responsible position of physician to the State Reformatory for Women in Sherborn, Massachusetts. Connected with the prison was a hospital of 150 beds, likely to be filled from a body of from 300-400 inmates. "Four years later," wrote Clara Barton, "it became my privilege, as superintendent of that prison, to observe how that duty was discharged by its resident physician. Perfect system prevailed. No prisoner could enter upon her term without a careful diagnosis of her physical condition and administration of the needful treatment. If any trace of mental trouble manifested itself, the case was closely watched and tenderly cared for. The most difficult surgical operations were performed, not only without loss of life but with marked success. The control of the doctor over her patients, and these included from time to time nearly every inmate, was simply marvelous, and her influence throughout the entire institution not less remarkable. Among all classes, she moved as one born to command, that most successful of all command, the secret of which lies in tact, conscious ability and sympathy with mankind. So long as that prison remains a success, so long will the influence of Dr. Hall's early administration and example for good be felt there." After nearly five years of service there, she was appointed superintendent by acclamation of the governor and his council. Though grateful for the honor, she declined the position, as its acceptance would necessitate the giving up of her medical work.

Soon after that, she formed a partnership with her colleague, Dr. Mosher, and together they began to practice in the city of Brooklyn, New York. In the autumn of 1884, they were appointed associate professors of physiology and hygiene and physicians to Vassar College, resigning in 1887, very much to the regret of all concerned. During the same year, upon the occasion of the semi-centennial commencement of the University of Michigan, Hall, as first vice-president of the Department of Medicine and Surgery, was called upon to preside at the meeting of that body. As her colleagues, many of the most eminent physicians and professors of the land were present. Afterward one of them remarked: "I had predicted that fifty years after the admission of women, a scene like this might occur. My prophecy has been anticipated by more than thirty years."

In the fall of 1887, she was appointed central committee delegate to the fourth International Conference of the Red Cross, of Geneva, held in Karlsruhe, Germany. By invitation she was a guest at the court of their Royal Highnesses, the Grand Duke and Grand Duchess of Baden. That high conference brought Hall into contact with very many of the most noted personages of the European courts, and that for a series of royal occasions and a length of time sufficient to challenge the scrutiny of the most critical. She passed not only unscathed, but with the highest commendations, everywhere doing honor to the U.S. and to American women. Her elegance of bearing was a subject of personal remark. The respect of Her Royal Highness, the Grand Duchess, was marked and thoughtfully manifested by the appreciative gifts bestowed as tokens of remembrance. Her standing in medical jurisprudence was recognized by the courts of justice in New York and she was often, called as an expert by the Supreme Court to take charge of examinations instituted by that tribunal.

After relocating to Los Angeles, California, she made a visit to Japan, where characteristically she visited hospitals, schools, missions, prisons and police courts. So highly was her interest valued that, on leaving, she was urged by the officials of medical and public education in that empire to return and lecture on physiology and hygiene. The invitation was a great compliment, and she returned for several months in 1907, lecturing in leading institutions in the great cities. In a letter to a Brooklyn friend, quoted in the Brooklyn Eagle, she wrote:—

Writer
As a writer, Hall contributed many articles upon health topics to the best magazines and other periodicals of the day. Her writings were characterized by a strength of thought, knowledge of her subject and a certain vividness of expression which held the attention of the reader. Some of her most important articles were: “Unsanitary Condition of Country Houses” (Journal of Social Science, December, 1888); “Inebriety in Women” (Quarterly Journal for Inebriety, October, 1883); “Prison Experiences” (Medico Legal Journal, March, 1888); “Physical Training for Girls” (Popular Science Monthly, February, 1885); “Wherewithal Shall We Be Clothed” (American Woman's Journal, May, 1895).

Affiliations
Hall was a member of the Kings County Medical Society, of Brooklyn; of the Pathological Society; of the New York Medico-Legal Society, of which she has been treasurer; of the New York Academy of Anthropology; and of the American Social Science Association, of which she was also vice-president. She was a fellow of the New York Academy of Medicine.

Personal life
In 1891, she married Robert George Brown, an electrical engineer. In 1904, her health impaired by an increasing heart weakness, they removed to Los Angeles. She died in that city, August 1, 1907, of valvular disease of the heart, and inflammatory rheumatism.

Selected works
 Bicycling and Health for Women, 1890

Notes

References

Attribution

Bibliography

External links

1843 births
1907 deaths
19th-century American writers
19th-century American women writers
19th-century American women physicians
19th-century American physicians
People from Orleans County, Vermont
Vassar College faculty
Milton College alumni
University of Michigan Medical School alumni
American social sciences writers
American women non-fiction writers
American women academics
Wikipedia articles incorporating text from A Woman of the Century